Justice Ruma Pal (born 3 June 1941) was a judge of the Supreme Court of India until her retirement on 3 June 2006.

Early life 
She read for her B.C.L degree at St Anne's College, Oxford and started practice in 1968 in Civil, Revenue, Labour and Constitutional matters in the Calcutta High Court. Her husband Samaraditya Pal was one of well known barristers of Kolkata.

Career 
After a long and distinguished career as an advocate, she was appointed Judge in the Calcutta High Court on 6 August 1990. She was further nominated to Supreme Court of India on 28 January 2000, the day of the Golden Jubilee of the court. Justice Pal has delivered many critical judgements in famous cases. She has written on a number of human rights issues. She is also a member of the International Forum of Women Judges.

Pal edited many text-books for legal studies including famous book on Indian Constitutional Law by Prof. M P Jain, which is considered as an authority. She became the Chancellor of Sikkim University and one of the trustees of legal diversity Nonprofit organization Increasing Diversity by Increasing Access.

References

External links
 Paper by Justice Pal on Violence Against Women 
 

1941 births
Living people
Judges of the Calcutta High Court
Justices of the Supreme Court of India
Women educators from West Bengal
Educators from West Bengal
20th-century Indian judges
20th-century Indian women judges
21st-century Indian judges
21st-century Indian women judges